The F. W. Welborn House is located in Fountain Inn, South Carolina.  The one-story Craftsman style bungalow was built in 1914 for Frank W. Welborn. It was one of the first houses in the city and is one of the most representative residential examples of the Craftsman style in the city.

The house features a brick foundation with weatherboard siding and an internal brick chimney. The house retains the majority of its original detailing, including original pine and oak flooring, trim, molding and detailing.

References

National Register of Historic Places in Greenville County, South Carolina
Houses completed in 1914
Houses in Greenville County, South Carolina